Yealands Estate is a winery based in the Marlborough wine region of New Zealand, originally established in 2008 by entrepreneur Peter Yealands. In 2018 it was taken over by Marlborough Lines, a community-owned power company. Yealands also produces the labels Crossroads, Babydoll and The Crossings.

History 

The winery was founded in 2008 by Peter Yealands on a large block of coastal land east of Seddon. Exports helped grow the business and its commercial success has resulted in several awards for its Sauvignon Blanc wines and sustainability efforts. In 2016 Yealands sold its Crossroads winery facility and land and moved to transporting its Hawke's Bay grapes to its Marlborough winery.

Export offence conviction and takeover 

After an investigation by the Ministry for Primary Industries, Yealands and two other staff were sentenced in 2018 under New Zealand's Wine Act 2003 for illegally adding sugar to wine exported to the European Union between 2013 and 2015, and falsifying records to conceal the activity. Marlborough Lines, who had already purchased a controlling stake in 2015, agreed not to sue Yealands in return for his resignation and remaining shares. The case has caused concerns in the New Zealand wine industry about its international reputation.

Sustainability 

The winery as one of its founding goals took early steps to implement a high level of sustainability in its operating practices. These practices include using sheep and chickens to control weeds and pests, conserving water usage, establishing wetlands to improve biodiversity, and using recycled materials for glass bottles and packaging. The 412 kW photovoltaic solar cell system installed at the winery was at the time the largest single solar array in New Zealand. The winery later ran into trouble with its waste reuse initiative to process pomace into feedstock, receiving penalties for inadequate construction of the storage facility and subsequent pollution of a local waterway. The winery has redoubled its sustainability drive since the 2018 takeover, committing to reducing its carbon emissions by 50 percent by 2030, and 80 percent by 2045.

See also

New Zealand wine

References

Wineries of New Zealand
Marlborough Region